Colwell Cut Viaduct, also known as Hogback Hill Bridge, is a historic concrete arch bridge located at Mahoning Township in Armstrong County, Pennsylvania. It was built in 1922, and is a  three-span bridge, with a  main span. It crosses the Pittsburg and Shawmut Railroad.

It was listed on the National Register of Historic Places in 1988.

References 

Road bridges on the National Register of Historic Places in Pennsylvania
Bridges completed in 1922
Bridges in Armstrong County, Pennsylvania
National Register of Historic Places in Armstrong County, Pennsylvania
Concrete bridges in the United States
Open-spandrel deck arch bridges in the United States